The 2015 Ligue Haïtienne season was the 52nd season of top-tier football in Haiti. The league was split into two tournaments—the Série de Ouverture and the Série de Clôture—each with identical formats and each contested by the same 20 teams.

Tables

Série d'Ouverture

Série de Clôture 

  1.FICA (Cap-Haïtien)                     19  11  5  3  29-15  38  Qualified
  2.Violette AC (Port-au-Prince)           19  11  5  3  25-15  38  Qualified
  3.Baltimore SC (Saint-Marc)              19  11  3  5  20-10  36  Qualified
  4.Don Bosco SC (Pétion-Ville)            19   9  6  4  28-12  33  Qualified
  - - - - - - - - - - - - - - - - - - - - - - - - -- - - - - - - -
  5.Cavaly AS (Léogâne)                    19   8  8  3  19-10  32
  6.AS Capoise (Cap-Haïtien)               19   9  5  5  22-17  32
  7.Racing Club Haïtien (Port-au-Prince)   19   7  9  3  23-18  30
  8.Valencia (Léogâne)                     19   8  3  8  23-17  27
  9.Ouanaminthe FC                         19   8  1 10  18-23  25
 10.América FC (Cayes)                     19   7  3  9  23-23  24
 11.Aigle Noir AC (Port-au-Prince)         19   5  8  6  22-15  23
 12.Roulado (La Gonâve)                    19   5  8  6  15-21  23
 13.AS Mirebalais                          19   5  7  7  13-14  22
 14.Police Nationale d'Haïti               19   5  7  7  13-19  22
 15.Racine FC (Gros-Morne)                 19   6  4  9  12-29  22
 16.Racing FC (Gonaïves)                   19   6  3 10  17-27  21
 17.Inter (Grand-Goâve)                    19   4  7  8  11-13  19
 18.Petit-Goâve FC                         19   5  4 10  11-22  19
 19.Tempête FC (Saint-Marc)                19   4  6  9  12-24  18
 20.US Lajeune (Pignon)                    19   3  4 12  11-23  13

Aggregate table 

  1.Don Bosco SC (Pétion-Ville)            38  21  8  9  57-27  71        Super 8
  2.FICA (Cap-Haïtien)                     38  20 10  8  50-28  65  [-5]  Super 8
  3.Baltimore SC (Saint-Marc)              38  19  8 11  34-23  65        Super 8
  4.Racing Club Haïtien (Port-au-Prince)   38  17 16  5  47-28  62  [-5]  Super 8
  5.AS Capoise (Cap-Haïtien)               38  18 12  8  42-24  61  [-5]  Super 8
  6.Cavaly AS (Léogâne)                    38  16 12 10  45-26  60        Super 8
  7.América FC (Cayes)                     38  18  5 15  47-36  59        Super 8
  8.Violette AC (Port-au-Prince)           38  16 10 12  38-34  58        Super 8
 - - - - - - - - - - - - - - - - - - - - - - - - -- - - - - - - -
  9.Aigle Noir AC (Port-au-Prince)         38  14 14 10  47-28  56
 10.AS Mirebalais                          38  13 11 14  33-37  50
 11.Inter (Grand-Goâve)                    38  12 11 15  28-34  47
 12.Ouanaminthe FC                         38  15  2 21  39-49  47
 13.Racing FC (Gonaïves)                   38  12 10 16  30-43  46
 14.Petit-Goâve FC                         38  12  9 17  24-37  45
 15.Tempête FC (Saint-Marc)                38  11 11 16  31-44  44
 16.Roulado (La Gonâve)                    38   9 16 13  29-44  43
 -----------------------------------------------------------------
 17.Valencia (Léogâne)                     38  14  5 19  38-40  42  [-5]  Relegated
 18.Police Nationale d'Haïti               38   8  9 21  27-48  33        Relegated
 19.US Lajeune (Pignon)                    38   7 12 19  23-41  33        Relegated
 20.Racine FC (Gros-Morne)                 38   7 11 20  21-59  32        Relegated

References

External links

2015
Haiti
Haiti
2015 in Haitian sport